The 1990 Grote Prijs Jef Scherens was the 24th edition of the Grote Prijs Jef Scherens cycle race and was held on 23 September 1990. The race started and finished in Leuven. The race was won by Wilfried Peeters.

General classification

References

1990
1990 in road cycling
1990 in Belgian sport